Double Island (originally Wangal Djungay (Djabugay) ) is an island close to the Queensland coast, inside the Great Barrier Reef  approximately 1.5 km, north east of Palm Cove, Queensland and about 30 km north of Cairns. Double Island (Wangal Djungay) was the location of an exclusive resort, but has been closed to the public for years. In 2012, Benny Wu from Hong Kong bought the island lease and plans a $10 million upgrade to the island’s resort for wealthy tourists.

History
The island had been known to, and used by, the local Australian Aborigines (predecessors of the Djabugay people), for many tens of thousands of years. The Djabugay people (particularly the Yirrgay group) believe it is the resting place of Gudju Gudju, a Rainbow Serpent The discovery of gold on the mainland west of the area assured that Double Island became well known in the 1880s and 1890s and it is said that, around this time, a mining company at Irvinebank used the island as a resort for employees. It was also around this time that some local graziers started using the island to graze cattle.

Hollywood stars Jennifer Aniston, Brad Pitt and Keanu Reeves have been among the celebrities who stayed on the island.

References

External links
 Double Island History

Islands of Queensland
Islands of Far North Queensland
Private islands of Australia
Cairns Region